SZL may refer to:

 The Silesian language (ISO 639-3 code)
 Swazi lilangeni (ISO 4217 currency code)
 Swaziland Airlink (ICAO airline code)
 Whiteman Air Force Base (IATA airport code)